The 5 July 2011 Taji bombings were two coordinated bombings, a car bomb followed by a bomb, that were detonated in the parking lot of a municipal government building in Taji, Iraq killing at least 35 and wounding at least 50.

See also

 List of terrorist incidents, 2011

References

2011 murders in Iraq
2011 in Iraq
Bombings in the Iraqi insurgency
Mass murder in 2011
Car and truck bombings in Iraq
Terrorist incidents in Iraq in 2011
Saladin Governorate
July 2011 events in Iraq
Building bombings in Iraq